Events from the year 1740 in France

Incumbents
 Monarch – Louis XV

Events
The mystical tradition called Martinism was established as a masonic high-degree system around 1740

Births

12 April − Claude André Deseine, sculptor (d. 1823)
26 April − Jean-Jacques Paulet, mycologist (d. 1826)
2 June − Marquis de Sade, nobleman, revolutionary politician, philosopher and writer (d. 1814)
6 June − Louis-Sébastien Mercier, dramatist and writer (d. 1814)
10 July − Louis-Étienne Ricard, politician (d. 1840)
27 July − Jeanne Baret, first woman to circumnavigate the globe (d. 1807)

Full date missing
Catherine Éléonore Bénard, noble (d. 1769)
François Cointeraux, architect (d. 1830)
Jean Baptiste François de La Villéon, vice-admiral.

Deaths

July − Jacques Barbel, French soldier in Canada (born c.1670)

Full date missing
Jacques Cassard, naval officer (born 1679)
Pierre Crozat, art collector (born 1665)
Jean Soanen, bishop (born 1647)
Nicolas Prosper Bauyn d'Angervilliers, politician (born 1675)
John Gagnier, orientalist (born 1670?)

See also

References

1740s in France